A messer (German for "knife") is a single-edged sword with a knife-like hilt. While the various names are often used synonymously, messers are divided into two types:

Lange Messer ("long knives") are one-handed swords used for self-defence. They were about a meter long and may have evolved from the Bauernwehr ("peasant's sidearm"). They are also known as Großes Messer ("great knife").

Kriegsmesser ("war knife") are curved weapons up to 1.5 m long, used with one or two hands, and normally wielded by professional warriors of the 14th to 16th century, such as the Landsknecht.

Typology 
There is a typology created by James G. Elmslie for messers and falchions similar to the Oakeshott typology for arming swords based on ongoing research.

Construction 

Messer are characterized by their single-edged blades. The lengths and shapes of the blade can vary greatly. Messer blades can be straight or curved.

The defining characteristic of messer is their hilt construction. Quite notable in its construction was the attachment of blade to the hilt via a slab tang sandwiched between two wooden grip plates that were pegged into place. Messer often include a straight cross-guard and a Nagel: a nail-like protrusion that juts out from the right side of the cross-guard away from the flat of the blade, to protect the wielder's sword hand. The length of the hilt can accommodate one- or two-handed grips.

Messer do not necessarily have pommels. Sometimes they may have end caps instead. However, messer with pommels generally are of the type that were 'drawn out' or curved to one side of the hilt (edge side), a feature known as a "hat-shaped pommel".

Fighting with the messer

The messer was part of the curriculum of several Fechtbücher (fighting manuals) of the 14th and 15th centuries, including that of Johannes Lecküchner (dealing with the langes messer), the Codex Wallerstein, Hans Talhoffer, Paulus Kal and Albrecht Dürer.

See also
Johannes Lecküchner
Falchion
Machete
Nodachi
Swiss degen
Zhanmadao

References

External links
Video interpretation of Four Sources on Messer Combat
Video interpretation of several of Lecküchner's Messer Plays
James Elmslie's Research
The Elmslie Typology

Medieval blade weapons
Renaissance-era weapons
Single-edged swords